Below is a list of football players who have gained international caps whilst playing club football at Nottingham Forest F.C.

Players have been categorised by their nationality.

Viv Anderson
Garry Birtles
Frank Burton
John Calvey
Gary Charles
Nigel Clough
Colin Cooper
Stan Collymore
Thomas Danks
Peter Davenport
Frank Forman
Fred Forman
Trevor Francis
Arthur Goodyer
Tommy Graham
Alan Hinton
Steve Hodge
James Iremonger
Harry Jones
Teddy Leighton
Harry Linacre
Tinsley Lindley
Larry Lloyd
Edwin Luntley
Stuart Pearce
Charlie Richards
John Sands
Peter Shilton
Albert Smith
Alf Spouncer
Steve Stone
Ian Storey-Moore
Des Walker
Neil Webb
Sam Weller Widdowson
Frank Wignall
Tony Woodcock

Mark Crossley
Robert Earnshaw
Arthur William Green
Chris Gunter
Terry Hennessey
Edwin Hughes
Andy Johnson
Brennan Johnson
Albert Jones
Charlie Jones
Grenville Morris
David Phillips
Ronnie Rees
Dean Saunders
Gareth Taylor
David Vaughan
Darren Ward

Kingsley Black
Lee Camp
David Campbell
Jimmy Chambers
Sammy Clingan
Fay Coyle
Alan Fettis
Gary Fleming
Tommy Jackson
Liam O'Kane
Martin O'Neill
Danny Sonner
Dale Taylor
Jamie Ward
Tommy Wright

Kenny Burns
Oliver Burke
Peter Cormack
Jason Cummings
Archie Gemmill
Scot Gemmill
Frank Gray
Stewart Imlach
Scott McKenna
John Robertson
Gareth Williams

Simon Cox
Miah Dennehy
Roy Keane
Noel Kelly
Andy Reid
John Thompson
Daryl Murphy

John Hanna
Boy Martin
Gerry Morgan
Pat Nelis

Lars Bohinen
Alfie Haaland
Einar Jan Aas
Kjetil Osvold

Bryan Roy
Hans van Breukelen
Pierre van Hooijdonk

Brynjar Gunnarsson
Toddy Orlygsson

Marlon King
Raimondo PonteAlan Davidson
David TarkaAdlène GuediouraDexter BlackstockJim BrennanGonzalo JaraNikola JerkanJunior AgogoRadoslaw MajewskiStern JohnEric LichajDeimantas PetravičiusVladimir StojkovicThomas LamApostolos VelliosMustapha CarayolTendayi DarikwaKarim AnsarifardLyle TaylorFouad BachirouNicholas IoannouBraian Ojeda'''
Mohamed Dräger

References

Internationals
Forest
Nott
Association football player non-biographical articles
Nottingham